This was the first edition of the tournament.

Sriram Balaji and Vishnu Vardhan won the title after defeating Cem İlkel and Danilo Petrović 7–6(7–5), 5–7, [10–5] in the final.

Seeds

Draw

References
 Main Draw

Chennai Open Challenger - Doubles